Waldemar Capucci (born 8 June 1929) is a Brazilian sports shooter. He competed at the 1976 Summer Olympics, the 1980 Summer Olympics and the 1984 Summer Olympics.

References

External links

1929 births
Possibly living people
Brazilian male sport shooters
Olympic shooters of Brazil
Shooters at the 1976 Summer Olympics
Shooters at the 1980 Summer Olympics
Shooters at the 1984 Summer Olympics
Sportspeople from São Paulo
Pan American Games medalists in shooting
Pan American Games bronze medalists for Brazil
Shooters at the 1975 Pan American Games
Shooters at the 1979 Pan American Games
20th-century Brazilian people